William J. Taylor (July 3, 1932 - May 4, 2018) was an American politician in the state of Florida.

He served in the Florida House of Representatives from 1976 to 1978 (77th district).

References

1932 births
2018 deaths
Democratic Party members of the Florida House of Representatives